Koziki is a rural locality (a village) in Novoalexandrovskoye Rural Settlement, Suzdalsky District, Vladimir Oblast, Russia. The population was 38 as of 2010. There are 9 streets.

Geography 
Koziki is located 33 km southwest of Suzdal (the district's administrative centre) by road. Petrakovo is the nearest rural locality.

References 

Rural localities in Suzdalsky District
Vladimirsky Uyezd